Likoporia is a village in the municipality of Xylokastro-Evrostina, in south-central Greece. It is situated about 50 km from Corinth, and 75 km from Patras. The greek Motorway 8 (Athens - Corinth - Patras) passes south of the village, and the Proastiakos (Athens - Corinth - Patras) passes through the village. 

Likoporia has a lighthouse with light characteristic "FL(2) 16s 10M" (white flashing light with a period of 16 seconds and a range of 10 miles).

References

External links 
 Official website -  Likoporia (in Greek)

Villages in Greece
